Purton is a village in Wiltshire, England.  

Purton may also refer to:

Places
Purton, Berkeley, a village near Berkeley in Gloucestershire, England on the east bank of the River Severn
Purton, Lydney, a hamlet near Lydney in Gloucestershire, on the west bank of the Severn opposite Purton, Berkeley

People
Jared Purton (1976–2009), Australian immunologist working in the United States
Louise Purton, Australian biologist
Zac Purton (born 1983), Australian horse jockey

See also 
Purton F.C.
Purton railway station
Pirton (disambiguation)
Puriton, a village in Somerset, England
Pyrton, a village in Oxfordshire, England